Southon is a surname. Notable people with the surname include:

 Arthur Eustace Southon (1887–1964), English Methodist minister
 Jamie Southon (born 1974), English footballer
 Mark Southon, New Zealand celebrity chef and TV personality
 Mike Southon (cinematographer), British cinematographer
 Mike Southon (writer), British entrepreneur and author
 Stephen Southon (1806–1880), English cricketer